The 1987 Air Force Falcons football team represented the United States Air Force Academy in the 1987 NCAA Division I-A football season. The Falcons offense scored 405 points while the defense allowed 269 points. At season's end, the Falcons appeared in the 1987 Freedom Bowl. In the Ram–Falcon Trophy match, the Falcons beat the Colorado State Rams to win the trophy.  Air Force also won the Commander-in-Chief's Trophy, emblematic of beating both Army and Navy.

Schedule

Personnel

Season summary

at BYU

Army

Air Force wins Commander-in-Chief Trophy

1987 team players in the NFL
The following were selected in the 1988 NFL Draft.

Awards and honors
Rip Burgwald, Bullard Award
Chad Hennings, Outland Trophy

References

Air Force
Air Force Falcons football seasons
Air Force Falcons football